The Hispaniolan desert gecko (Aristelliger expectatus) is a species of lizard in the family Sphaerodactylidae. The species is  endemic to the island of Hispaniola.

Geographic range
A. expectatus is found in both the Dominican Republic and Haiti, including associated small islands of the two countries, such as Beata, Tortuga, and Gonâve.

Reproduction
A. expectatus is oviparous.

References

Further reading
Cochran DM (1933). "A New Gecko from Haiti, Aristelliger expectatus ". Proceedings of the Biological Society of Washington 46: 33–35.

Aristelliger
Reptiles described in 1933
Reptiles of the Dominican Republic
Reptiles of Haiti
Endemic fauna of Hispaniola